Miedwie is a lake in the Pomeranian Lakeland region of West Pomeranian Voivodship, in northwestern Poland.

Geography
It is 16.2 km long and 3.2 km wide. Its maximum depth is 43.8 m. 

The lake has a 150m long pier.

Miedwie lake and its surrounding area is a Natura 2000 EU Special Protection Area.

See also
 
 Rów Kunowski
 Special Protection Areas in Poland

References

Lakes of West Pomeranian Voivodeship
Natura 2000 in Poland
Parks in West Pomeranian Voivodeship
Lakes of Poland
Pyrzyce County
Stargard County